Da'wat al-Ḥaqq is a monthly Islamic cultural magazine published by the Moroccan . It was first published in 1957, under King Muhammad V the year after independence.

The magazine was regarded as a "guardian of Arab-Islamic values," and it was supported by the monarchy. Abdulqader as-Sahrawi was one of its early editors.

While it began as a cultural project, in the 1960s, under Hassan II, it became an instrument for the consolidation of the monarchy.

References 

Cultural magazines
Magazines published in Morocco
Literary magazines
Islamic magazines
Arabic-language magazines
Magazines established in 1957